Notes for a Film About Donna and Gail is a Canadian drama film, directed by Don Owen and released in 1966. The film centres on Donna (Michèle Chicoine) and Gail (Jackie Burroughs), two young women who work together at a dress factory and live together as roommates, tracing the evolution and decline of their friendship in a documentary-style format. The film makes use of the then-novel device of an unreliable narrator, ultimately revealing that the film is much more about the narrator's skewed perceptions of the women's relationship than it is about the women themselves. It was inspired in part by the contemporaneous films of Jean-Luc Godard.

The characters of Donna and Gail recurred in Owen's 1967 feature film The Ernie Game. Prior to the release of The Ernie Game, in which Donna and Gail were involved in a love triangle with Alexis Kanner's Ernie, some critics who had seen only Notes perceived Donna and Gail as being in a quasi-lesbian relationship; however, Owen demurred on this perception by saying "I really don't know, because, well, what is a lesbian relationship?"

Awards
 Montreal International Film Festival, Montreal: First Prize, Medium Length, 1966
 19th Canadian Film Awards, Montreal: Genie Award for Best Film, General Information, 1967
 Melbourne Film Festival, Melbourne: Diploma of Merit, 1967

References

External links
 Notes for a Film About Donna and Gail at the National Film Board of Canada
 

1966 films
Canadian drama films
English-language Canadian films
Films directed by Don Owen
National Film Board of Canada films
Canadian Screen Award-winning films
1966 drama films
1960s English-language films
1960s Canadian films